The Movement for a Democratic Military (MDM) was an antiwar and GI rights organization during the Vietnam War. Initially formed in late 1969 as a merger of sailors from San Diego and marines from the Camp Pendleton Marine Base in Oceanside, CA, it rapidly spread to a number of other cities and bases in California and the mid-West, including San Francisco, Long Beach Naval Station, El Toro Marine Air Station, Fort Ord, Fort Carson and the Great Lakes Naval Training Center. Heavily influenced by the Black Panther Party and the Black militancy of the times., it became one of the more radical GI organizations during that era and was investigated in 1971 by the House Committee on Internal Security (formerly HUAC).

As with much of the GI movement during this era, chapters had a high turnover as members were transferred, discharged and disciplined by the military. By late 1970 several chapters had splintered or disbanded, but the group's name and demands proved popular within the GI resistance movement overall. Some chapters continued through 1971 and 1972 and one until 1975.

Founding

MDM started at the civilian supported Green Machine antiwar coffeehouse in Vista, CA not far from Camp Pendleton. It began as a merger of a small group of sailors in San Diego called GI's Against Fascism and a larger group of marines at Camp Pendleton. The San Diego group already had a newspaper called Duck Power and the marines began by publishing a newspaper called Attitude Check whose first issue, dated November 1, 1969, announced that it was "written by marines and ex-marines for the benefit of the common snuffy, grunt, and em" ("snuffy", "grunt" and "em" were common slang names for enlisted marines). The organization seemed to hit a nerve among local marines and sailors and on December 14 in nearby Oceanside an estimated 1,000 Black, White and Chicano GIs were among 4,000 who participated in an antiwar march and rally with speeches by Donald W. Duncan, Captain Howard Levy, Angela Davis and a number of active duty GIs.

Preamble and 12 Demands

At this rally, MDM's spokespeople presented and explained the organization's Preamble and 12 Demands, which had also been published simultaneously in the December 1, 1970 issues of Duck Power and Attitude Check. The Preamble stated "that ending the suppression of the American serviceman is an important part of a larger struggle for basic human rights" and pledged "support for the self-determination of all peoples." It ended, "We have been silent for a long time. We will be silent no longer."

The 12 demands included: An immediate end to the Vietnam War, collective bargaining for GIs, "human and constitutional rights [for] military men and women," the ending of censorship and intimidation within the military, the abolition of "mental and physical cruelty in military brigs, correctional custodies, and basic training", doing away with the "court-martial and non-judicial punishment systems," "wages equal to the federal minimum wage," "the abolition of the class structure of the military," an end to "all racism everywhere," the freeing of all political prisoners, including Eldridge Cleaver and Huey Newton," an end to "the glorification of war," and the abolition of the draft.

Spread

San Diego

The pre-existing group of sailors in San Diego called GI's Against Fascism merged with the group at Camp Pendleton. They all agreed to use the MDM name while publishing two newspapers, Duck Power in San Diego and Attitude Check at Pendleton. In mid-1970 the San Diego chapter changed the name of their newspaper to Dare to Struggle which they continued to publish until mid-1971. Attitude Check's last issue was in June 1970. The Camp Pendleton and San Diego areas were very pro-military and the MDM members located there experienced significant hostility and harassment. The San Diego area MDM had close ties with the San Diego Free Press which helped them put out their newspapers.

Great Lakes Naval Station

By early 1970 MDM had spread to several other cities and military bases. In January, a chapter formed at the Great Lakes naval base, located north of Chicago, IL, the largest U.S. Navy training base and the only boot camp for naval enlistees. Aided by activists with the Wisconsin Draft Resistance and the Chicago Area Military Project, a counseling service and coffeehouse, this chapter was one of the most active and included a considerable number of black sailors. They began publishing The Navy Times Are Changing which continued until the end of 1972. On Armed Forces Day in May 1970 they sponsored a rally near the base which attracted 50 sailors and nearly 500 civilians. Another rally in September of that same year "drew a crowd of over five hundred sailors and civilians." When four Black WAVES were illegally arrested by base commanders in July 1970, more than 100 sailors marched to where the women were being held and surrounded the building, refusing to move until the women were released. Within weeks of this incident, over 900 enlisted men and women were discharged or transferred to other bases by the navy. On Armed Forces Day in 1972, MDM and the Chicago Area Military Project organized a large demonstration with 400 GIs joining a crowd of over 2,000.

San Francisco Bay Area

Tom Csekey, one of the sailors who founded GI's Against Fascism in San Diego traveled to San Francisco and helped form two chapters of MDM in the Bay Area. There was a short-lived chapter at Fort Ord near Monterey, CA which published the Right-On Post from May to August 1970. And a San Francisco Bay Area chapter with members from the Alameda Naval Air Station, Treasure Island, San Francisco and other military bases, which published their newspaper Up Against the Bulkhead regularly from 1970 to 1972 and then sporadically until 1975. The Up Against the Bulkhead paper and staff played an important role in helping sailors from the USS Coral Sea organize a November 6, 1971 antiwar demonstration in San Francisco involving over 300 men from the ship. This chapter was the longest lasting MDM organization and their newspaper was one of the more professional and widely distributed.

El Toro Marine Air Base

In July 1970 another chapter formed at the El Toro Marine air base in Orange County, CA. They published a newspaper called Pay Back consistently until the end of 1970 and then sporadically for another year.

Fort Carson

In mid-1970 a group of GI from the Fort Carson army base near Colorado Springs, CO began to meet and publish a newspaper called Counter Attack. They were supported by the Homefront GI coffeehouse. As with all the other chapters, they experienced a high turnover rate and disbanded by mid-1971.

Rules

MDM was more disciplined than most other GI resistance organizations of the period. At a June 1970 regional conference involving chapters from Camp Pendleton, San Diego, the Bay Area, Fort Ord, Long Beach, and El Toro the members approved 16 strict Rules for MDM Members. These included no narcotics or marijuana, no racism, no male chauvinism or sexism, no criminal activity or stealing from the people, putting the interests and needs of the people before personal pleasure, mandatory participation in political education classes, no misuse of funds, and instructions that if arrested members were to give only name, rank, and serial number.

Controversy

Some critics of MDM have argued that their 12 demands, if implemented "would have rendered the U.S. military totally ineffective as a fighting force." In an interview in January 1971 in The Marine Corps Gazette, Marine commandant general Leonard F. Chapman Jr. said MDM was "a serious threat to the defense of this country."

House Internal Security Committee

The House Committee on Internal Security investigated MDM and the broader GI movement. They concluded that the GI Movement "is the organized efforts by relatively small numbers of GIs and pseudo pacifist civilians to enlist and engage the participation by United States armed services personnel in the so-called peace movement." A witness before the committee described MDM's efforts at Fort Ord as follows:

The general purpose of the MDM was to recruit soldiers, to propagandize them, to encourage them to file for conscientious objector status, to hold demonstrations enlisting their sympathy against the Army and the establishment, to conduct ... certain operations aimed at distributing propaganda literature upon the military reservation illegally, and to disrupt in general and neutralize the effectiveness of Fort Ord as a military training base.

Other Views

Other observers agreed that MDM was on the more radical end of the GI movement but were more favorable. One scholar observed that MDM viewed "the war in a much broader context of military and social oppression that MDM hoped to eradicate. For many groups on the Left, ending the Vietnam War was a liberal issue in comparison to the more revolutionary goal of transforming American society. For members of the armed forces facing the prospect of combat in Southeast Asia, ending the war was a critical issue. The MDM demands, framed as they were in broad social and political terms, reflect a strong Left political influence on at least some of the GI antiwar groups." The Stanford Daily viewed MDM as a lifeline to the GIs: "These men have already suffered the dehumanization process of boot camp and many of them are being prepared for Viet Nam. They were living a nightmare of which there was little relief until MDM developed."

Radicalism

MDM itself was quite upfront with its radicalism. As the August 1970 Right-on Post newspaper published at Fort Ord put it:

The goal of MDM as an organization is to educate GIs to the real causes of their oppression, and to help them move to put an end to the problem. Through a black-brown-white coalition, we will educate one another, struggle together and defend one another. Rising as one, with clenched fists, we will break the man's chains. We are not afraid of the man's stockades; we've been there. The Vietnamese freedom fighters have shown us the way: a united force of brothers and sisters determined to free themselves can defeat the U.S. military monster.

Harassment, Attacks and Police Infiltration

Several of the MDM chapters and their affiliated GI coffeehouses experienced legal and non-legal harassment from the pro-military towns where they were located and even violent attacks from right-wing organizations. In one instance, the Green Machine coffeehouse near Camp Pendleton was shot up on April 29, 1970 with 45 caliber machine gun fire, wounding one of the marines inside in the shoulder. A clandestine paramilitary right-wing group called the Secret Army Organization was suspected. Another involved the San Diego Chapter on February 8, 1970. According to the lawyer and author Mark Lane, the San Diego Police and Navy Shore Patrol

"smashed down the door of a San Diego store front ... to break up a peaceful meeting of Marines, Sailors and civilians." This was preceded by "several hours of terror on the streets in the vicinity by the local and military police during which civilians were threatened and detained by the cops and GI's were taken into custody, physically pushed around and finally arrested on non-existent charges."MDM Press Release

The San Diego MDM chapter was reported to have been infiltrated by as many as four undercover police agents during 1970, including San Diego Policemen Randy Curtis and John Paul Murray. Murray achieved a considerable amount of local notoriety when he was exposed as an agent because he had become one of the leading members of San Diego MDM. He had gained a reputation for advocating more militant and sometimes illegal actions, including inciting violent confrontations with the police and supplying weapons to the Oceanside MDM chapter. He was even accused of attempting to talk some local activists into blowing up the San Diego - Coronado Bridge. Several women supporters of MDM accused the married Murray of lying to and sleeping with them. One member of the San Diego chapter of the antiwar group Concerned Officers Movement recalled Murray being so convincing as the committed antiwar activist that he ironically helped convince him to file as a conscientious objector. There were so many undercover agents infiltrating antiwar and activist organizations that from 1972 to 1973 the San Diego underground newspaper The Door published eleven Undercover Agent Trading Cards, each showing a different police agent. In 1978, the Los Angeles Times published a list of almost 200 organizations that had been under surveillance during the early 1970s by the Los Angeles Police Department. One of these was the Movement for a Democratic Military.

Legacy

MDM may have been the most radical of the GI antiwar and military resistance organizations of significant size during the Vietnam War. It has been estimated that they had between five thousand and ten thousand members and they had viable chapters in over half-a-dozen military bases and cities. Their stand against the Vietnam War, their call for self-determination of all peoples and their opposition to discrimination and racism proved popular with a segment of GI, particularly minority GIs, as was the idea of democratizing the military. The military considered them a serious threat. With the transfer and discharge of many of its most active members, chapters were hard to sustain and by the end of the Vietnam War, MDM's last remaining chapter dissolved.

See also
 Concerned Officers Movement
 FTA Show - 1971 anti-Vietnam War road show for GIs
 F.T.A. - documentary film about the FTA Show
 GI's Against Fascism
 GI Coffeehouses
 GI Underground Press
 Opposition to United States involvement in the Vietnam War
 Presidio mutiny
 Sir! No Sir!, a documentary about the anti-war movement within the ranks of the United States Armed Forces
 Vietnam Veterans Against the War

External links
 
 Sir! No Sir!, a film about GI resistance to the Vietnam War
 A Matter of Conscience - GI Resistance During the Vietnam War
 Waging Peace in Vietnam - US Soldiers and Veterans Who Opposed the War

Footnotes

Anti–Vietnam War groups
American military personnel of the Vietnam War
United States military support organizations
Organizations established in 1969
Organizations disestablished in 1975
Resistance Inside the Army